The Union of International Associations (UIA) is a non-profit non-governmental research institute and documentation center based in Brussels, Belgium, and operating under United Nations mandate. It was founded in 1907 under the name Central Office of International Associations by Henri La Fontaine,  the 1913 Nobel Peace Prize laureate, and Paul Otlet, a founding father of what is now called information science.

The UIA is an independent research institute and a repository for current and historical information on the work of global civil society. It serves two main purposes: to document and promote public awareness of the work of international organizations (both INGOs and IGOs), international meetings, and world problems. The UIA also supports and facilitates the work of international associations through training and networking opportunities.

It has consultative status with ECOSOC and UNESCO.

Aims

 Facilitate the development and efficiency of nongovernmental networks in every field of human activity – especially non-profit and voluntary associations – considered to be essential components of contemporary society
 Collect, research and disseminate information on international bodies, both governmental and nongovernmental, their interrelationships, their meetings, and the problems and strategies with which they are concerned
 Experiment with meaningful and action-oriented ways of presenting such information to enable these initiatives to develop and counterbalance each other creatively, and act as a catalyst for the emergence of new forms of associative activity and international co-operation
 Promote research on the legal, administrative and other problems common to these international associations, especially in their contacts with governmental bodies
 Contribute to a universal order based on principles of human dignity, solidarity of peoples and freedom of association and communication

History
The two founders started work setting up the Central Office of International Organisations and then conducting a survey of international organisations with headquarters in Belgium. Then with the help of the sociologist Cyril van Overbergh they extend this research to organisations based elsewhere. After collaborating with Alfred Fried on the production of Annuaire de la Vie Internationale they produced their own edition without him.

Top meeting places

2018

1999 to 2018

Publication
In 1923, UIA published Code des voeux internationaux, codification générale des voeux et résolutions des organismes internationaux, with a preface by Henri La Fontaine.

See also
Yearbook of International Organizations
International Congress Calendar
Encyclopedia of World Problems and Human Potential
UNESCO
International Institute of Intellectual Cooperation

References

External links

Organizations established in 1907
International organisations based in Belgium